is the eighteenth studio album by the Japanese heavy metal band Loudness. It was released only in Japan, in January 2004. The album is one of the heaviest released by the band, and was created with a theme of horror and terror. This theme is also reflected in the album artwork. The band display influences from Black Sabbath, and the album overall has a doom metal type sound.

Track listing
All songs written by Loudness

"Pharaoh" - 7:08
"Cyber Soul" - 5:35
"Life After Death" - 5:02
"Let's Free Our Souls" - 4:37
"Detonator (Fire and Thunder)" - 3:09
"Cross" - 8:49
"About to Kill" - 4:46
"Double-Walker" - 6:36
"City of Vampire" - 5:57
"Seventh Heaven" - 4:30
"Terror" - 4:46

Personnel
Loudness
Minoru Niihara - vocals
Akira Takasaki - guitars
Masayoshi Yamashita - bass 
Munetaka Higuchi - drums

Production
Masatoshi Sakimoto - engineer, mixing
Yuki Mitome - assistant engineer
Yoichi Aikawa - mastering
Norikazu Shimano, Shinji Hamasaki - supervisors
Yukichi Kawaguchi, Junji Tada - executive producers

References

External links
 Official album page

2004 albums
Loudness (band) albums
Japanese-language albums
Tokuma Shoten albums